This is a list of activities carried out by the U.S. Central Intelligence Agency in China.

Activities in the Republic of China
Chiang Kai-shek, President of the Republic of China, suspected that the United States was plotting a coup against him. In 1950, Chiang Ching-kuo became director of the secret police, which he remained until 1965. Chiang also considered some people who were friends to Americans to be his enemies. An enemy of the Chiang family, Wu Kuo-chen, was kicked out of his position of governor of Taiwan by Chiang Ching-kuo and fled to America in 1953. Chiang Ching-kuo, educated in the Soviet Union, initiated a Soviet style military reorganization in the Republic of China's military, which reorganized and Sovietized the political officer corps, surveillance, and Kuomintang party activities. Opposed to this was Sun Li-jen, who was educated at the American Virginia Military Institute. 

Chiang orchestrated the controversial court-martial and arrest of General Sun Li-jen in August 1955, for plotting a coup d'état with the American CIA against his father Chiang Kai-shek and the Kuomintang. The CIA allegedly wanted to help Sun take control of Taiwan and declare its independence.

Activities in the People's Republic of China

1951

In order to open a second front in the Korean War, CIA officers decided to rely upon a second plan. CIA operators were fearful of Mao Zedong's entry into the war and estimated that a substantial amount of Kuomintang Nationalist guerillas were available to work with the agency. They also estimated that Muslim horsemen led by Ma Bufang would be willing to launch attacks against China in its western regions. When both of these efforts proved to be overly projected in terms of success and strategic actualities, the U.S., convinced that a third force was available within China, decided to invest resources into securing such a force to its efforts. In order to facilitate resistance against China's involvement in Korea, the CIA invested over $100 million in buying weapons that would be used by "third force" guerillas in China. The Agency scarcely could find any anti-Mao sentiment within their contacts, however, with the only signs of life being a group of refugees in Okinawa, invariably proven to be a group more interested in obtaining their own goals than in truly assisting the United States.

Eventually, the CIA declassified its records and admitted the failures of the Third Force strategy. The list illuminated a quick study on insurgency failures. According to the documents, the CIA began dropping small guerilla units into China, the first Third Force team having been deployed in April, 1952. All four members of the team were never heard from again. The second Third Force team was made up of five ethnic Chinese agents, and dropped into the Jilin region of Manchuria in mid-July 1952. The team eventually reported contact with local rebel leaders. The team was, unbeknownst to the CIA, captured and turned by the Chinese, setting up the ensuing trap.  The CIA responded by sending in a rescue unit, only to have its planes shot down and its principal agents assigned to the mission, Jack Downey and Dick Fecteau, arrested. Both men were subsequently sentenced to prison sentences in China. Beijing later boasted of the insurgency failures of their United States counterparts. At that point, the CIA had dropped 212 agents into China, resulting in 101 agents killed and 111 captured. Michael D. Coe, who had been recruited by the CIA and worked within the agency during the Third Force events, stated that the CIA "had been sold a bill of goods by the Nationalists - that there was a huge force of resistance inside of China. We were barking up the wrong tree. The whole operation was a waste of time."

1959
The CIA provided the Tibetan Chushi Gangdrug Tenshung Danglang Mak group with material assistance and aid, including arms and ammunition, as well as training to members of Chushi Gangdruk and other Tibetan guerrilla groups at Camp Hale.

2010
According to an investigation by The New York Times, the government of the PRC was able to either kill or imprison 18 to 20 CIA sources from 2010 to 2012; an article in Foreign Policy cited a higher number, putting the number of sources killed at at least 30. A joint CIA and FBI counterintelligence operation set up to investigate the intelligence failure advanced three different theories as to why the spy network was dismantled: (1) there was a mole within the CIA, (2) "sloppy tradecraft" and (3) PRC intelligence agents had hacked the covert system the CIA used to communicate with its foreign sources. The New York Times said that the debate over the cause remained unsolved while the a former American intelligence official cited by Foreign Policy said investigators concluded that it was caused by a "confluence and combination of events." In January 2018, a former CIA officer named Jerry Chun Shing Lee was arrested and would eventually plead guilty on suspicion of helping dismantle the network while the Foreign Policy article ascribed, notwithstanding the arrest, the failure to the ability of the PRC intelligence agencies to penetrate the CIA's communication system.

Sun Bo, a general manager of the China Shipbuilding Industry Corporation, was investigated for corruption and supplying classified information to the CIA, including technical specifications of the Chinese aircraft carrier Liaoning, according to Asia Times. Sun Bo was sentenced to 12 years in prison on July 4, 2019.

A December 2020 article by Zach Dorfman in Foreign Policy suggested that decades of corruption inside of the Chinese Communist Party (CCP) had created vulnerabilities exploited by outside intelligence agencies, particularly the CIA. CCP purges under the guise of anti-corruption were at least partially motivated by counterintelligence concerns.

2021
In October 2021, The New York Times citing a leaked CIA cable, reported that the CIA had admitted to have lost a "troubling number of informants" recruited from countries including China in recent years, with informants being killed, captured or compromised. The leaked cable comes amid China's recent efforts in hunting down CIA sources to turn them into double agents. The memo also mentions a "breach of the classified communications system" that led to spy networks in China being caught and that some officials believe that treasonous US intelligence officers may be the culprits responsible for the arrests and execution of CIA spies.

References

China–United States relations
Espionage in China
History of the foreign relations of China
Politics of China